The New Zealand cricket team toured England in June 2021 to play two Test matches against the England cricket team. In April 2021, New Zealand named their squad for the two-match series, with the same team also being named for the 2021 ICC World Test Championship Final, which was also played in England later in June 2021. The following month, England named their Test squad, with several players rested following their participation in the 2021 Indian Premier League.

The first Test ended in a draw, after no play was possible on the third day due to rain. Devon Conway, on his Test debut for New Zealand, scored 200 runs in the first innings. In the second Test, James Anderson played in his 162nd match, becoming the most capped player for England in Test cricket. New Zealand won the second Test by eight wickets to win the series 1–0. It was the first time that New Zealand had won a Test series in England since 1999, and it was also England's first Test series defeat at home since losing to Sri Lanka in 2014.

Squads

The England squad left out Jos Buttler, Chris Woakes, Sam Curran, Moeen Ali and Jonny Bairstow, rested after their participation in the 2021 Indian Premier League. Also missing were Jofra Archer, out with an elbow injury, and Ben Stokes, with a broken finger. Jack Leach was the only spinner to be selected, with Dom Bess being left out of the squad. Ollie Robinson and James Bracey were both included, with neither of them capped at Test level. Ahead of the series, Ben Foakes was ruled out of England's squad after suffering a hamstring injury.  As a result of Foakes being ruled out of the series, Sam Billings and Haseeb Hameed were both added to England's squad. With Ben Stokes being unavailable for the series, Stuart Broad was named as the vice-captain for England.

Ollie Robinson made his debut for England in the first Test match of the series. On the day of his international debut, Robinson had to make an apology for making racist and sexist tweets in 2012 and 2013. On 6 June 2021, Robinson was removed from the England squad for the second Test match of the series, and suspended from all formats of international cricket by the England and Wales Cricket Board (ECB). Dom Bess was added to England's squad for the second Test.

Kane Williamson was ruled out of New Zealand's squad for the second Test due to an elbow injury. As a result, Tom Latham was named as New Zealand's captain for the match. Mitchell Santner was also ruled out of New Zealand's squad for the second Test due to a finger injury, and BJ Watling was additionally ruled out due to a back injury.

Tour match
Ahead of the Test series, New Zealand were scheduled to play a tour match against Somerset. However, due to the COVID-19 pandemic, New Zealand would play a two-day intra-squad match instead. Tom Latham and Kane Williamson were named as the captains of each side. On 17 May 2021, the majority of New Zealand's squad arrived in England.

Test series

1st Test

2nd Test

Notes

References

External links
 Series home at ESPN Cricinfo

2021 in English cricket
2021 in New Zealand cricket
International cricket competitions in 2021
New Zealand cricket tours of England